The  took place in 1517 in Aki Province, Japan during the Sengoku period. During the battle, Takeda Motoshige was defeated by a young Mōri Motonari. It was Motonari's first battle.

Background
In the early 16th century Takeda Motoshige (also known as Motoshigeru), a local lord of Aki Province, accompanied the daimyō Ōuchi Yoshioki, his liege lord, to restore Ashikaga Yoshitane to the shogunate in Kyoto. At some point around 1515 Motoshige returned to Aki and broke off from the Ōuchi, changing his allegiance to the Amago.

At this time the Mōri clan (a vassal of the Ōuchi), were neighbors of the Takeda in Aki. When Mōri Okimoto died in 1516, and was succeeded by his young son Komatsumaru, Takeda Motoshige took advantage of this and, in the following year, gathered an army of 5,000 and in October advanced into the territory of the Mōri's Yoshikawa allies and surrounded . The Mōri clan's response was led by Mōri Motonari, younger brother to Okimoto and guardian of Komatsumaru.

Battle
With most of the Ōuchi forces preoccupied in Kyoto with Ōuchi Yoshioki, the Mōri were unable to call on them for assistance, and Motonari instead mobilized his clan and called on their supporters. Motonari was also supported in this by his younger brother, Mototsuna.  In total the Mōri strength comprised around 850 men, reinforced by 300 from the Yoshikawa, for a total of around 1,000. This force marched towards Arita Castle and on the way encountered the Takeda vanguard of about 500 men, commanded by Kumagai Motonao. The Mōri and their allies stood off and engaged the Takeda with archery fire. Kumagai Motonao was in the front ranks and was encouraging his men when he was struck and killed by an arrow.

Takeda Motoshige was meanwhile with the main army at Arita Castle. Learning of Motojika's demise, he drew up his forces and marched to engage the smaller Mōri resistance. The Takeda encountered the Môri and Yoshikawa occupying the opposite bank of the Uchikawa River and a bitter struggle ensued. Heavily outnumbered, the Mōri-led forces began to falter and fall back, and rallied only when Motonari pleaded with them to stand their ground. Takeda Motoshige himself advanced forward across the river on horseback but was struck by an arrow and killed. The Takeda broke and retreated, leaving Mori Motonari the victor.

References

Bibliography
 Rekishi Gunzō Shirizu No. 49, Mōri Senki, Gakken, Japan, 1997
 Arita Castle (有田城址) – Kitahiroshima-chō Tourist Information Website (Kitahiroshima-chō Tourism Association)

External links
 Samurai Archives entry for Battle of Arita-Nakaide

Arita-Nakaide
Arita-Nakaide 1517
1517 in Asia
Mōri clan